Phlegmariurus megastachyus is a species of firmoss (genus Huperzia) found exclusively in Madagascar.

References

megastachyus
Endemic flora of Madagascar